"Bang My Head" is a song by French DJ and music producer David Guetta, featuring vocals from Australian singer Sia and American rapper Fetty Wap. It was released as the second single from the re-release of Guetta's sixth studio album, Listen. "Bang My Head" tallies as the album's seventh single overall. It was released via digital download on 30 October 2015. The original album version of the song only featured Sia's vocals, but the second verse was later replaced with vocals from Fetty Wap for the reworked single release.

Composition 
Musically, the song is written in the key of A minor. The album version of the song follows a chord progression of Am–G–F and has a tempo of 124 beats per minute.  However, the single version of the song featuring American rapper Fetty Wap has a tempo of 108 beats per minute. Sia's vocals span two octaves, from G3 to G5.

Music video
The music video premiered on 6 November 2015. The video shows Guetta losing a game of poker and a woman (played by the Hungarian model Gabriella Kuti) stepping in to win it all back for him in a technicolour horse race. Neither Sia nor Fetty Wap appear in the video.

Track listing
Digital download – album track
"Bang My Head" (featuring Sia) – 3:53

Digital download – Single
"Bang My Head" (featuring Sia and Fetty Wap) – 3:13

Digital download – Remixes EP
"Bang My Head" (featuring Sia and Fetty Wap) (Extended) – 4:44
"Bang My Head" (featuring Sia and Fetty Wap) (Robin Schulz Remix) – 5:53
"Bang My Head" (featuring Sia and Fetty Wap) (Feder Remix) – 3:58
"Bang My Head" (featuring Sia and Fetty Wap) (Glowinthedark Remix) – 3:48
"Bang My Head" (featuring Sia and Fetty Wap) (Kryder & Dave Winnel Remix) – 4:56
"Bang My Head" (featuring Sia and Fetty Wap) (JP Candela Remix) – 5:45
"Bang My Head" (featuring Sia) (Extended) – 5:26

Charts

Weekly charts

Year-end charts

Certifications

References

External links

2014 songs
2015 singles
David Guetta songs
Fetty Wap songs
Sia (musician) songs
Songs written by David Guetta
Songs written by Sia (musician)
Songs written by Giorgio Tuinfort
Songs written by Christian Karlsson (DJ)
Songs written by Vincent Pontare
Songs written by Magnus Lidehäll
Music videos directed by Hannah Lux Davis
Song recordings produced by David Guetta